Otto Schenk was a German racing cyclist. He won the German National Road Race in 1948.

References

External links
 

Year of birth missing
Year of death missing
German male cyclists
Place of birth missing
German cycling road race champions
People from Schweinfurt
Sportspeople from Lower Franconia
Cyclists from Bavaria
20th-century German people